Askarovo (Aśqar) is a rural locality (a village) and the administrative centre of Askarovsky Selsoviet, Burzyansky District, Bashkortostan, Russia. The population was 487 as of 2010. There are 6 streets.

Geography 
Askarovo is located 49 km north of Starosubkhangulovo (the district's administrative centre) by road. Islambayevo is the nearest rural locality.

References 

Rural localities in Burzyansky District